Marcantonio Colonna was one of four s built for the  (Royal Italian Navy) during the late 1920s. Due to her age, her usefulness was limited, and she saw no real service during the war. The submarine was decommissioned in 1942 and scrapped the following year.

Design and description
 
Designed in parallel with the s, the Pisani class was larger accommodate more fuel and give them more range. They displaced  surfaced and  submerged. Their crew numbered 48 officers and enlisted men.

For surface running, the boats were powered by two  diesel engines, each driving one propeller shaft. When submerged each propeller was driven by a  electric motor. They could reach  on the surface and  underwater.

The boats were armed with six  torpedo tubes, four in the bow and two in the stern for which they carried a total of nine torpedoes. They were also armed with a single  deck gun forward of the conning tower for combat on the surface. Their anti-aircraft armament consisted of two  machine guns.

Construction and career
Marcantonio Colonna was laid down by Cantiere Navale Triestino in their Trieste shipyard on 3 December 1925, launched on 26 November 1927, and completed on 10 July 1929.

Notes

References

External links
 Marcantonio Colonna Marina Militare website

World War II submarines of Italy
1927 ships
Ships built in Monfalcone
Pisani-class submarines